John David Anderson is an American writer of middle-grade fiction. His works include Posted, Ms. Bixby's Last Day, Stowaway, One Last Shot, Riley's Ghost, Insert Coin to Continue, The Dungeoneers, Sidekicked, Minion, Granted, and Standard Hero Behavior.

Life
Anderson was born and raised in Indianapolis, Indiana, where he currently resides. He is married to Alithea Anderson and is the father of twins, Isabella and Nikhil.

Anderson attended Indiana University, where he received an undergraduate degree in English literature, and the University of Illinois, where he received a master's degree in the same. He is a full-time writer and frequent presenter at schools across the country. His books have been featured on many state and library reading lists.

Works
 Standard Hero Behavior, 2007, Clarion Books
 Sidekicked, 2013, Walden, HarperCollins
 Minion, 2014, Walden, HarperCollins
 The Dungeoneers, 2015, Walden, HarperCollins
 Ms. Bixby's Last Day, 2016, Walden, HarperCollins
 Insert Coin to Continue, 2016, Aladdin Books
 Posted,  2017, Walden, HarperCollins
 Granted, 2018, Walden, HarperCollins
 Finding Orion, 2019, Walden, HarperCollins
 One Last Shot, 2020, Walden, HarperCollins
 Stowaway, 2021, Walden, HarperCollins
 Riley's Ghost, 2022, Walden, HarperCollins

References

1975 births
Writers from Indiana
Writers from Indianapolis
Living people